Johnson Hill is a mountain located in the Catskill Mountains of New York south of Franklin. Gallop Hill is located southwest, Lumbert Hill is located east, and Hodges Hill is located west of Johnson Hill.

References

Mountains of Delaware County, New York
Mountains of New York (state)